Igreja de Santa Maria may refer to:

 Gereja Santa Perawan Maria Ratu (Jakarta), a church in Indonesia
 Igreja de Santa Maria (Loures), a church in Portugal
 Igreja de Santa Maria (Serpa), a church in Portugal
 Igreja de Santa Maria (Sintra), a church in Portugal